High Seize is a turn-based tactics video game for the Nokia N-Gage, published by Nokia and developed by RedLynx, released in late 2005.

Story
A retired navy captain is forced return to his swashbuckling days, as his father is kidnapped by a notorious pirate. As events unfolds, the captain has to hunt for mythical treasures and take on the most feared of all pirates, Black Barlow.

Features
High Seize can be played both as a single-player game, and in a multi-player mode, using either hot-seat, N-Gage Arena or a local Bluetooth connection.

Reception

The game received "generally favorable reviews" according to the review aggregation website Metacritic.

References

External links
 

N-Gage games
2005 video games
Turn-based tactics video games
Naval video games
Video games developed in Finland
RedLynx games
Nokia games
Multiplayer and single-player video games